Farlowella is a genus of fish in the family Loricariidae native to South America. This genus is broadly distributed in Amazon, Orinoco, Paraná and coastal rivers of the Guyana Shield. It is absent from the Pacific slope of the Andes and from the coastal rivers of the Brazilian Shield. Many of these species are kept in aquariums. This genus has a unique body shape that resembles a thin stick of wood. The body is slender and elongate, often with a pronounced rostrum and a brownish color with two lateral dark stripes beginning at the tip of the rostrum, passing over the eyes and ending at the tail, which are periodically interrupted on the caudal peduncle.

Taxonomy
The genus is placed within the tribe Harttiini of the subfamily Loricariinae. Morphological, molecular and phylogenetic studies have placed Farlowella as sister to Sturisoma. The genus name of Farlowella is named in honor of William Gilson Farlow, a famous American botanist of Harvard University whose main work was working with algae plants, the favorite food of this slender catfish.

Species
There are currently 28 recognized species in this genus: 
 Farlowella acus (Kner, 1853) 
 Farlowella altocorpus Retzer, 2006
 Farlowella amazonum (Günther, 1864)
 Farlowella colombiensis Retzer & Page, 1997
 Farlowella curtirostra G. S. Myers, 1942
 Farlowella gianetii Ballen, Pastana & L. A. W. Peixoto, 2016 
 Farlowella gracilis Regan, 1904
 Farlowella hahni Meinken, 1937
 Farlowella hasemani C. H. Eigenmann & Vance, 1917
 Farlowella henriquei A. Miranda-Ribeiro, 1918
 Farlowella isbruckeri Retzer & Page, 1997
 Farlowella jauruensis C. H. Eigenmann & Vance, 1917 
 Farlowella knerii (Steindachner, 1882)
 Farlowella mariaelenae Martín Salazar, 1964
 Farlowella martini Fernández-Yépez, 1972
 Farlowella mitoupibo Ballen, Urbano-Bonilla & Zamudio, 2016 
 Farlowella nattereri Steindachner, 1910
 Farlowella odontotumulus Retzer & Page, 1997
 Farlowella oxyrryncha (Kner, 1853)
 Farlowella paraguayensis Retzer & Page, 1997
 Farlowella reticulata Boeseman, 1971
 Farlowella rugosa Boeseman, 1971
 Farlowella schreitmuelleri C. G. E. Ahl, 1937
 Farlowella smithi Fowler, 1913
 Farlowella taphorni Retzer & Page, 1997
 Farlowella venezuelensis Martín Salazar, 1964
 Farlowella vittata G. S. Myers, 1942
 Farlowella yarigui Ballen & Mojica, 2014

References

 
Loricariidae
Fish of South America
Freshwater fish genera
Taxa named by Carl H. Eigenmann
Taxa named by Rosa Smith Eigenmann
Catfish genera